Hans Zoller (16 February 1922 – 11 September 2020) was a Swiss bobsledder who competed in the 1950s and 1960s. He won a gold medal in the four-man event at the 1957 FIBT World Championships in St. Moritz. He also competed in Bobsleigh at the 1964 Winter Olympics, where he finished 10th in both the two man and four man bobsled events.

References

External links
 
Bobsleigh four-man world championship medalists since 1930

1922 births
2020 deaths
Swiss male bobsledders
Bobsledders at the 1964 Winter Olympics
Olympic bobsledders of Switzerland
20th-century Swiss people